Landor or Landor Station is a pastoral lease and sheep station located in the Gascoyne region of Western Australia.

The distance by road is considerably longer,  via the Great Northern Highway. It is well grassed with buffel, saltbush, bluebush, cotton bush and other vegetation, including mulga, acacia and currara.

The property was established prior to 1925 as a cattle station, but then swapped to sheep. Approximately 12,00 sheep were shorn in 1925, with numbers increasing to 40,000 in 1926 and 50,000 in 1927.

In 1998 the  property was acquired by Richie Brennan from Malcolm McCusker. In 2013 Brennan had reported that cattle worth 500,000 had been stolen from the property over the last decade.

The station homestead is situated close to where the Landor River meets the Gascoyne River. Both the river and the station were named by the surveyor HS Carey, most likely after the barrister EW Landor.

The heritage-listed Nundigo well and stockyards are found on the station. They are located close to the boundary of Landor and Errabiddy station between the tributaries of Bubbagundy Creek and the soft country.
The eastern side of the yard is surrounded by flood gums while open scrub is found to the west. The yards were used by drovers as a staging area for cattle headed to the railhead at Meekatharra. They were deliberately built in soft country so that the cattle could be shod so they could more easily cross the stony country that lay ahead.

Landor Races
Originally the racecourse was located about half a mile from the homestead. The racecourse has its own airstrip, stables, water and electricity supply, dance hall, dining room and grandstand. The public camp site that is adjacent to the course has its own toilet and shower facilities. Races are held on the first weekend in October, coinciding with the school holidays.

The races were first held in 1921 when stockmen from stations in the area such as Mount Augustus, Milgun, Mount Seabrook and Erravilla held a race on their day off to find who had the fastest horse. The races have been held almost continuously ever since, with races not being held for several years during World War II. No starting gates exist, all races are walk up starts. 

The inaugural winner of the 1922 Eastern Gascoyne Race Club Landor Cup, run over a mile, was a horse named "Johnny the Gun". The winner of the 2012 Landor Cup was "Cathcart".

See also
 List of pastoral leases in Western Australia

References

Homesteads in Western Australia
Pastoral leases in Western Australia
Shire of Upper Gascoyne
Stations (Australian agriculture)
Heritage places of Western Australia